Jonathan Patrick Foo (born 30 October 1982) is a Singaporean–English actor, martial artist and stunt performer known for his role as Jin Kazama in the 2009 live action film Tekken.

Early life
Foo was born in London to a Chinese Singaporean father and an Irish-English mother. He has a younger sister and two half-sisters on his father's side. His family constantly moved. Inspired by his father's interest in karate and mother's interest in judo, he began training in kung fu. Foo now trains in mixed styles. He went from performing at festivals with the London Chinese Acrobats (Gangs of New York) to signing with one of the biggest film companies in Asia.

Career
Being a practitioner of wushu, he has starred in Tom-Yum-Goong (US title: The Protector), Batman Begins, House of Fury, Left for Dead, and Life (Shi cha qi xiao shi). He also performs stunts for other actors. He is perhaps best known for playing the role of Jin Kazama in the 2009 live action film Tekken. He also played Ryu in the short film Street Fighter: Legacy.

He also starred in Universal Soldier: Regeneration (2010) as one of the first generation soldiers. He is set to appear in a Thai martial arts-basketball film Fireball Begins, which is a prequel to the first film, Fireball. Foo's films were his second lead role in Bangkok Revenge, he appears with Dominic Purcell in Vikingdom and Danny Glover in Extraction and stars as Detective Lee in the television adaptation of Rush Hour (the role played by Jackie Chan in the film series).

Filmography

References

External links 

1982 births
Living people
Male actors from London
English male film actors
English male television actors
British stunt performers
British wushu practitioners
British male actors of Chinese descent
English people of Chinese descent
English people of Irish descent
English people of Singaporean descent
Singaporean people of Chinese descent
English expatriates in the United States
21st-century English male actors